Amar Abba is a former Ambassador Extraordinary and Plenipotentiary of the People's Democratic Republic of Algeria to the Russian Federation (with concurrent accreditation in Belarus). He was later named the Ambassador to the United Kingdom with concurrent accreditation in the Republic of Ireland.

Education
Abba graduated from the National Administration School, Diplomatic Section in 1972.

Personal life
Abba is married with three children.

References 

Algerian diplomats
1940s births
Living people
Ambassadors of Algeria to Russia
Ambassadors of Algeria to Belarus
Ambassadors of Algeria to Ireland
Ambassadors of Algeria to the United Kingdom
21st-century Algerian people